The 2023 WAC women's basketball tournament is the postseason women's basketball tournament of the Western Athletic Conference (WAC) for the 2022–23 season. The conference tournament is scheduled to be played from March 7–11, 2023, at Michelob ULTRA Arena and the Orleans Arena in Paradise, Nevada near Las Vegas. The first round will be played on March 6 at Michelob ULTRA Arena with the remaining rounds March 8–11 at the Orleans Arena. The winner of the conference tournament will receive the conference's automatic bid to the NCAA tournament.

Seeds
Twelve of the thirteen members will be invited to the tournament. While Tarleton and Utah Tech are ineligible for the NCAA tournament, they are eligible for the WAC tournament. The WAC Resume Seeding rankings are an advanced analytic developed by Ken Pomeroy that incorporates the performance of teams in both conference and non-conference games.  Rankings were initially released on December 5. While seedings are determined using the WAC Resume Seeding System, the top 12 teams that qualify for the tournament will be determined based on conference league records.

Schedule

Bracket

See also 

 2023 WAC men's basketball tournament

References

Tournament
WAC women's basketball tournament
Basketball competitions in the Las Vegas Valley
College basketball tournaments in Nevada
WAC women's basketball tournament
WAC women's basketball tournament
Women's sports in Nevada